The Nude Bomb (also known as The Return of Maxwell Smart) is a 1980 American spy comedy film based on the 1965-70  television series Get Smart. It stars Don Adams as Maxwell Smart, Agent 86, and was directed by Clive Donner. It was retitled The Return of Maxwell Smart for television.

Co-creators Mel Brooks and Buck Henry notably had no involvement in the making of the film. Furthermore, Adams and Robert Karvelas (as Larrabee) were the only original cast members of the TV series to reprise their roles for the film.

Dana Elcar portrays the Chief in The Nude Bomb due to the death of Edward Platt, the original Chief, in 1974. Eugene Roche was originally cast as the Chief in this film, but was replaced by Elcar due to illness. Barbara Feldon as Agent 99 in the TV series, does not appear in the film nor is she referenced; Feldon claimed that she was unaware of the film's production and was not asked to reprise the role of 99, but wouldn't have accepted in any case. Sylvia Kristel, at the time best known for her appearances in the Emmanuelle erotic film series, makes a brief appearance as Agent 34, with Andrea Howard as Agent 22 (in a role similar to Agent 99) and Vittorio Gassman playing the Blofeld-like villain. Joey Forman, who played Harry Hoo in the TV series, was recast as Agent 13. Pamela Hensley, who at the time was well known to science fiction fans for playing Princess Ardala in Buck Rogers in the 25th Century,appeared as Agent 36.

Plot

Agent Maxwell Smart is called back into service in order to stop a nefarious KAOS terrorist plan from exploding a bomb that destroys only clothing, so as to leave KAOS as the only supplier of clothes to the entire world. Norman Saint-Sauvage, the KAOS fashion designer, finds everyone else's clothing designs gauche, so he builds a machine capable of cloning his favorite seamstress and implements the Nude Bombs. He wears a costume including thimbles over each finger, and his mountain lair is entered via a giant zipper.

Cast

Production
Parts of the film were shot in Salt Lake City, Utah.

Smart's agency, called CONTROL in the TV series, was called PITS in this film, an acronym standing for "Provisional Intelligence Tactical Service".

In spite of the title, the film was given a PG rating because there was no frontal nudity in the film; in the opening theme sequence, a title card reads: "Would you believe... a film called The Nude Bomb would get a PG rating". (The PG-13 rating was not created until 1984.) There are five times in the film where the bomb is detonated, but in each case the actors cover up their private areas with strategically placed briefcases (Soviet officials) or guns (Buckingham palace guards) or are shown only from the waist up. In one case, members of a football team are in a huddle when a bomb detonates, revealing bare behinds of some of the players. In the final scene, the three stars of the film are rendered nude by fallout from the destruction of all the bombs at the enemy headquarters, but are seen from the backsides from a distance, and then with a "The End" caption covering each of their backsides.

Reception and aftermath

The Nude Bomb received a 17% rating on Rotten Tomatoes, based on 18 reviews and was a box-office disappointment, grossing $14.7 million on a $15 million budget.

The film was nominated for a Golden Raspberry Award for Worst Picture.

Nearly a decade later another revival film was produced, this time for TV, on ABC. Get Smart, Again! featured most of the surviving original cast members (including Feldon as Agent 99) and ignored the events that took place in The Nude Bomb in order to maintain continuity with the original series. This was followed by a short-lived revival TV series for Fox. A feature film remake of the series was a box-office success in 2008, grossing $230,685,453 worldwide.

TV premiere
In 1982, NBC broadcast the film on television for the first time with its original title The Return of Maxwell Smart.

Home media
The movie was released on VHS for the first time by MCA Universal Home Video in 1991.

The film was released on Region 1 DVD on August 26, 2008 and Region 4 on October 30, 2009.

It was released in Australia on Blu-ray on June 22, 2016.

Kino Lorber released a Blu-ray edition of the film on December 10, 2019 featuring new extras, including TV and radio spots, behind the scenes galleries as well as a commentary track by Alan Spencer.

References

External links
 
 
 
 

Get Smart films
1980 films
1980s spy comedy films
1980s parody films
1980s English-language films
American spy comedy films
American parody films
Adaptations of works by Mel Brooks
Films directed by Clive Donner
Films scored by Lalo Schifrin
Films shot in Salt Lake City
Parody films based on James Bond films
Universal Pictures films
1980 comedy films
1980s American films